Gălăuțaș is a commune in Harghita County, Transylvania, Romania. It is composed of eight villages: Dealu Armanului (Ármándombja), Gălăuțaș, Gălăuțaș-Pârău (Galócáspatak), Nuțeni (Nucén), Plopiș (Ploptyis), Preluca (Preluka), Toleșeni (Tolésén) and Zăpodea (Zapodéa). At the 2011 census, the commune had a population of 2,498; out of them, 76% were Romanian, 20% were Hungarian and 1.1% were Roma.

Gălăuțaș is the birthplace of Jewish-Transylvanian sculptor Márton Izsák.

References

Communes in Harghita County
Localities in Transylvania
Székely communities